Malabar is a term used for Indians originating from the Malabar region. The region includes the present state of Kerala in India, i.e. the southwestern coast of the country.

See also
Malabar district
Malabar pepper

References

History of Réunion
Kerala society
Malabar Coast